UFC: The Ultimate Ultimate (also known as Ultimate Ultimate 1995 or UFC 7.5) was an event held by the Ultimate Fighting Championship on December 16, 1995, at the Mammoth Gardens in Denver, Colorado.  The event was seen live on pay-per view in the United States, and later released on home video.

History
Ultimate Ultimate 1995 featured an eight-man tournament with the winner receiving $150,000. The event also featured two alternate fights, which were not shown on the live pay-per-view broadcast.

The tournament had no weight classes, or weight limits. Each match had no rounds, but a 15-minute time limit was imposed for the quarterfinal and an 18-minute time limit for semi-final round matches in the tournament.

The finals of the tournament had a 27-minute time limit and, if necessary, a three-minute overtime.

Ultimate Ultimate 1995 was also the first UFC event to feature judges, who would score the bouts in the event of a draw.

The referee for the night was 'Big' John McCarthy.

Dan Severn won the tournament by defeating Oleg Taktarov.

Six of the nine fights ended by submission. The other three ended by Unanimous Decision (The Semi-finals and The Finals).

Results

Ultimate Ultimate 1995 bracket

See also 
 Ultimate Fighting Championship
 List of UFC champions
 List of UFC events
 1995 in UFC

External links
 UU 95 results at Sherdog.com
 UU 95 fights reviews
 Official UFC website

Ultimate Fighting Championship events
1995 in mixed martial arts
Mixed martial arts in Colorado
Sports competitions in Denver
1995 in sports in Colorado
Events in Denver